The United States-Hong Kong Policy Act, or more commonly known as the Hong Kong Policy Act or Hong Kong Relations Act, is a 1992 act enacted by the United States Congress. It allows the United States to continue to treat Hong Kong separately from Mainland China for matters concerning trade export and economic control after the 1997 Hong Kong handover.

The Act was amended on November 27, 2019, by the Hong Kong Human Rights and Democracy Act.

On May 27, 2020, Secretary of State Mike Pompeo declared Hong Kong "no longer autonomous", putting its special designation into doubt.

On July 14, 2020, the Hong Kong Autonomy Act was signed into law. It was enacted in response to the Hong Kong national security law and imposes sanctions on persons who violate the Sino-British Joint Declaration and the Hong Kong Basic Law and the banks that do business with them.

Content
The act states that Hong Kong maintains its own export control system as long as it adapts to international standards. The act also pertains to "sensitive technologies", which require Hong Kong to protect the technologies from improper use. The U.S will fulfill its obligation to Hong Kong under international agreements regardless of whether the People's Republic of China is a participant of the particular agreement until the obligations are modified or terminated. Should Hong Kong become less autonomous, the US president may change the way the laws are applied. The State Department's Deputy Assistant Secretary for Export Controls has stated US will not prejudge the situation in advance of monitoring efforts.

Due to the Act, CoCom members designated Hong Kong a "cooperating country" since 1992 until CoCom ceased to function in 1994.

Reaction
In the run-up to the handover of Hong Kong, former Senator Jesse Helms (then chairman of the U.S. Senate's Foreign Relations Committee and a supporter of the Act) wrote in an opinion piece for the Wall Street Journal of the benefits that the Act had for relations between Hong Kong and the United States.

Beijing criticized the act, describing it as foreign interference into the domestic affairs of the PRC.

Academics, members or organizations of the Hong Kong pro-democracy camp and U.S. Congress have called for the Act to be reviewed in connection with the 2019 Hong Kong extradition bill proposal, the ensuing protests against it and the subsequent introduction of the Hong Kong Human Rights and Democracy Act.

See also
 2019 Hong Kong extradition bill 
 2019–20 Hong Kong protests
 Hong Kong Human Rights and Democracy Act
 Hong Kong Autonomy Act
 Hong Kong–United States relations

References

External links
 United States-Hong Kong Policy Act of 1992

1992 in law
1992 in international relations
United States foreign relations legislation
Hong Kong–United States relations